The American Society of Mechanical Engineers Design and Engineering Division awards yearly the Leonardo Da Vinci Award to eminent engineers whose design or invention is recognized as an important advance in machine design. The award is named after Leonardo da Vinci.

Winners

See also

 Other awards and medals of the ASME
 ASME Achievement awards
 ASME Medal - ASME highest award 
 List of engineering awards

References

Leonardo da Vinci
American Society of Mechanical Engineers
Awards established in 1978
American science and technology awards
1978 establishments in the United States
ASME Medals